Patrick Curtis may refer to:
 Patrick Curtis (bishop) (1740–1832), Irish Roman Catholic archbishop
 Patrick Curtis (producer) (1939–2022), American producer and actor